"I'm a Gummy Bear (The Gummy Bear Song)" is a novelty dance song by Gummibär, in reference to the gummy bear, a type of bear-shaped candy originating in Germany. It was written by German composer Christian Schneider and released by Gummibär's label Gummybear International. The song was first released in Hungary, where it spent eight months as number one atop the ringtones chart.

Subsequently, it became a global phenomenon as an Internet meme, in large part due to its corresponding videos on YouTube and MySpace. It has since been released in at least 43 languages, and the English version alone has spread virally worldwide, with more than 2.9 billion plays on YouTube alone.

The French version ("Funny Bear") was written by Peter Kitsch. The French music video has over 512 million views on YouTube , making it one of the top-10 most-viewed French videos on the site. It peaked at number eight on the French Singles Chart.

With the song ready-made for ringtone use, one critic commented "he's the ultimate cross-platform, cross-cultural phenomenon YouTube was designed to unleash." It is heard on his debut album I Am Your Gummy Bear released in 2007. Since the song's release, many songs, including a cover of "Blue (Da Ba Dee)", have been released by Gummibär.

Multiple languages
Several versions have been released in many languages. The song was originally released in German and English, and, as mentioned, the French version has received more than half a billion views. Gummibär released a whole album of their new languages on YouTube.

Other languages include Japanese, Korean, Dutch, Portuguese, Hungarian, Swedish, German, Slovak, Swahili, Turkish, and several more.

Music video

Videos corresponding to at least 43 languages are currently uploaded featuring the titular character in orange underwear bouncing and breakdancing.

Gummibär, the highly stylized character, is fat and wears orange Y-front briefs and white sneakers. The character also seems to be bitten with a small portion of its upper-left ear missing. The bear's muzzle, or mustache and goatee, are sugar-crusted and with only two small teeth spaced far apart on his lower jaw.

The music video, posted on October 9, 2007, has over 2.9 billion views on YouTube , making it one of the top-50 most-viewed videos on the site.

In 2006, the video, a 30-second CGI pop promo animated in Softimage XSI, was directed, designed and animated by Pete Dodd and was produced through Wilfilm in Copenhagen for Ministry of Sound GmbH in Berlin.

In popular culture 

 The song is featured in the 2020 horror-comedy film Spree, directed by Eugene Kotlyarenko.
 A remix of the song by Fanfare Ciocărlia is used near the end of the 2020 Sacha Baron Cohen mockumentary Borat Subsequent Moviefilm.
 A parody of the song, known as "I am a Bunny Dog", is featured in an episode of Paradise PD.
 The song is featured in the video game Just Dance Kids 2.
 The song is also featured in the 2021 Netflix family film Yes Day.

Charts

Weekly charts

Year-end charts

Certifications

See also 

 Crazy Frog
 Blue (Da Ba Dee)

References

2006 songs
2007 debut singles
Dance-pop songs
Confectionery in fiction
Internet memes
Novelty songs
Macaronic songs
Number-one singles in Greece
Songs about bears
Internet memes introduced in 2007
Gummibär songs